Javon Francis (born 14 December 1994) is a Jamaican sprinter. He won silver medals in the 4 × 400 m relay at the 2013 World Championships and 2016 Olympics. At the 2016 Olympics he also took part in the individual 400 m event, but was eliminated in the semifinal. He was the flag bearer for Jamaica during the closing ceremony.

References

External links

 

1994 births
Living people
Jamaican male sprinters
Sportspeople from Kingston, Jamaica
World Athletics Championships athletes for Jamaica
World Athletics Championships medalists
Olympic athletes of Jamaica
Olympic silver medalists for Jamaica
Olympic silver medalists in athletics (track and field)
Medalists at the 2016 Summer Olympics
Commonwealth Games medallists in athletics
Commonwealth Games bronze medallists for Jamaica
Athletes (track and field) at the 2016 Summer Olympics
Athletes (track and field) at the 2018 Commonwealth Games
Athletes (track and field) at the 2019 Pan American Games
Pan American Games competitors for Jamaica
20th-century Jamaican people
21st-century Jamaican people
Medallists at the 2018 Commonwealth Games